Pseudocoremia leucelaea is a species of moth in the family Geometridae. It is endemic to New Zealand. The species was first described by Edward Meyrick in 1909 from specimens collected by Alfred Philpott.

References

Boarmiini
Moths of New Zealand
Moths described in 1909
Endemic fauna of New Zealand
Taxa named by Edward Meyrick
Endemic moths of New Zealand